Guinea, officially the Republic of Guinea, is a country in West Africa. Formerly known as French Guinea, it is today sometimes called Guinea-Conakry to distinguish it from its neighbor Guinea-Bissau and the Republic of Equatorial Guinea. Guinea has abundant natural resources including 25 percent or more of the world's known bauxite reserves. Guinea also has diamonds, gold, and other metals.

Notable firms 
This list includes notable companies with primary headquarters located in the country. The industry and sector follow the Industry Classification Benchmark taxonomy. Organizations which have ceased operations are included and noted as defunct.

See also 
 Economy of Guinea
 List of banks in Guinea

References 

Companies of Guinea
 
Guinea